The 1926 Illinois Fighting Illini football team was an American football team that represented the University of Illinois during the 1926 Big Ten Conference football season.  In their 14th season under head coach Robert Zuppke, the Illini compiled a 6–2 record and finished in a tie for sixth place in the Big Ten Conference. Charles E. Kassel was the team captain.

Schedule

Awards and honors
Bernie Shively, (Guard)
Consensus All-American, Guard
Robert Reitsch, (Center)
All-American, Center

References

Illinois
Illinois Fighting Illini football seasons
Illinois Fighting Illini football